The Libertarian Party of Canada fielded a number of candidates in the 1984 Canadian general election, none of whom were elected.  Information about these candidates may be found on this page.

Myron Petriw (York South—Weston)

Petriw had previously campaigned for the Libertarian Party of Ontario in a provincial by-election.  During the provincial campaign, Petriw indicated that he had lived in York South since 1963, and worked at an automobile plant in Oakville.

References

 
1984